HMS Resolution was a 70-gun third rate ship of the line of the Royal Navy, built by Joseph Allin the elder (in accordance with the 1706 Establishment) at Deptford Dockyard, and launched on 25 March 1708.

Resolution was wrecked in 1711.

Notes

References

Lavery, Brian (2003) The Ship of the Line - Volume 1: The development of the battlefleet 1650-1850. Conway Maritime Press. .

Ships of the line of the Royal Navy
1700s ships